Robert Kula (born August 24, 1967) is a former American football offensive tackle who played college football at Michigan State University and attended Brother Rice High School in Bloomfield Township, Oakland County, Michigan. Kula was drafted by the Seattle Seahawks in the seventh round of the 1990 NFL Draft. He was a consensus All-American in 1989. He was Rimington–Pace Offensive Lineman of the Year in 1989. He played two seasons with the Montreal Machine of the World League of American Football (WLAF).

References

External links
Just Sports Stats

Living people
1967 births
Players of American football from Michigan
American football offensive tackles
Michigan State Spartans football players
Montreal Machine players
All-American college football players
Sportspeople from Oakland County, Michigan
Brother Rice High School (Michigan) alumni